Tim Bond is a New Zealand rugby union footballer who plays as a lock.

Bond has played for both Suntory Sungoliath in the Japanese Top League and the Bay of Plenty Steamers in his home country.   He was also named in the first ever  squad which will compete in Super Rugby from the 2016 season.

References

1989 births
Living people
New Zealand rugby union players
New Zealand expatriate rugby union players
New Zealand expatriate sportspeople in Japan
Expatriate rugby union players in Japan
Rugby union locks
Tokyo Sungoliath players
Bay of Plenty rugby union players
Sunwolves players
Rugby union players from Christchurch